John and Abigail Adams (stylized onscreen as John & Abigail Adams) is a 2006 television documentary film about John Adams, the 2nd President of the United States, and his wife Abigail Adams. Produced by PBS for the American Experience documentary program, it recounts the Adams couple's lives and partnership through both dramatizations and interviews. The film was directed by Peter Jones and written and produced by Elizabeth Deane, and it first aired on PBS in the United States on January 23, 2006.

Cast
Simon Russell Beale as John Adams
Linda Emond as Abigail Adams
James Barbour as Thomas Jefferson
Anne Harsch as 19-year-old Nabby Adams
David Mokriski as 12-year-old John Quincy Adams
Noah Pimentel as 7-year-old John Quincy

Interviewees
Joseph Ellis, historian
John Ferling, historian
Joanne Freeman, historian
Edith B. Gelles, historian
David McCullough, biographer and historian

Critical response
Louis Howard of DVD Talk gave John and Abigail Adams four out of five stars, writing that it is "[a]nother strong entry" of the American Experience program. Howard added that while the film is 120 minutes in length, shorter than most other films from the series, it "has the advantage of brisk storytelling, keeping the viewer's interest throughout." Leigh H. Edwards of PopMatters expressed that the documentary is better at "refram[ing] its subjects for a 21st-century audience" than Benjamin Franklin, another film from American Experience about a founding father. Edwards stated that it "avoids [...] hagiography by focusing on many of Adams' own weaknesses and self-doubts, even while emphasizing how his genius and foresight led him to become [...] the 'premiere political thinker in Revolutionary America.'"

Home media
John and Abigail Adams was released on DVD by PBS on January 24, 2006, the day after it aired on television. Though the film is part of The Presidents collection of American Experience, it is not included in the collection's DVD box set released on August 26, 2008.

References

External links
PBS official site

2006 television films
2006 films
2006 documentary films
American Experience
American documentary television films
Biographical television films
Documentary films about presidents of the United States
Cultural depictions of John Adams
Cultural depictions of John Quincy Adams
Cultural depictions of Thomas Jefferson
Films scored by Steve Porcaro
2000s English-language films
2000s American films